The , colloquially , is a diacritic most often used in the Japanese kana syllabaries to indicate that the consonant of a syllable should be pronounced voiced, for instance, on sounds that have undergone rendaku (sequential voicing).

History

The kun'yomi pronunciation of the character  is nigori; hence the daku-ten may also be called the nigori-ten. This character, meaning muddy or turbid, stems from historical Chinese phonology, where consonants were traditionally classified as clear ( "voiceless"), lesser-clear ( "aspirated") and muddy ( "voiced"). (See: Middle Chinese § Initials)

Dakuten were used sporadically since the start of written Japanese; their use tended to become more common as time went on. The modern practice of using dakuten in all cases of voicing in all writing only came into being in the Meiji period.

The handakuten is an innovation by Portuguese Jesuits, who first used it in the Rakuyōshū. These Jesuits had the need to accurately transcribe Japanese sounds, which the Japanese tended to neglect by making no distinction between /h/, /b/ and /p/ in their own writing.

Glyphs
The dakuten resembles a quotation mark, while the handakuten is a small circle, similar to a degree sign, both placed at the top right corner of a kana character:
 
 
 
 
 
 

Both the dakuten and handakuten glyphs are drawn identically in hiragana and katakana scripts. The combining characters are rarely used in full-width Japanese characters, as Unicode and all common multibyte Japanese encodings provide precomposed glyphs for all possible dakuten and handakuten character combinations in the standard hiragana and katakana ranges. However, combining characters are required in half-width kana, which does not provide any precomposed characters in order to fit within a single byte.

The similarity between the dakuten and quotation marks (") is not a problem, as written Japanese uses corner brackets (「」).

Phonetic shifts
The following table summarizes the phonetic shifts indicated by the dakuten and handakuten. However, the handakuten (lit. "half-muddy mark") does not follow this pattern.

They are not used in normal Japanese writing, but may be used by linguists and in dictionaries (or to represent characters in fiction who speak that way). This is called . Another rare application of handakuten is on the r-series, to mark them as explicitly l:  , and so forth. This is only done in technical or pedantic contexts, as many Japanese cannot tell the difference between r and l. Additionally, linguists sometimes use  to represent  in cases when speaker pronounces  at the beginning of a word as a moraic nasal.

In katakana only, the dakuten may also be added to the character  u and a small vowel character to create a  sound, as in ヴァ va. However, a hiragana version of this character also exists, with somewhat sporadic compatibility across platforms. As  does not exist in Japanese, this usage applies only to some modern loanwords and remains relatively uncommon, and e.g.

Precomposed characters exist for this method as well, although most IMEs do not have a convenient way to enter them.

In Ainu texts, handakuten can be used with the katakana  to make it a /ts/ sound,  ce [tse] (which is interchangeable with ), and is used with small fu to represent a final p, .

Kana iteration marks
The dakuten can also be added to hiragana and katakana iteration marks, indicating that the previous kana is repeated with voicing:

Both signs are relatively rare, but can occasionally be found in personal names such as Misuzu or brand names such as Isuzu (いすゞ).  In these cases the pronunciation is identical to writing the kana out in full. A longer, multi-character iteration mark called the kunojiten, only used in vertical writing, may also have a dakuten added.

Other communicative representations
Representations of Dakuten

Representations of Handakuten

 Voiced syllables and semi-voiced syllables do not have independent names in radiotelephony and are signified by the unvoiced name followed by "ni dakuten" or "ni handakuten".

 Full Braille representation

See also
 Tsu (kana)
 Sokuon

References

External links
 

Kana
Japanese phonology
Japanese writing system terms
Diacritics